Yaroslav Alekseyevich Kosov (Russian: Ярослав Алексеевич Косов; born July 5, 1993) is a Russian professional ice hockey player. He is currently an unrestricted free agent who most recently  played with Avangard Omsk in the Kontinental Hockey League (KHL). Kosov was selected by the Florida Panthers in the 5th round (124th overall) of the 2011 NHL Entry Draft.

Playing career
Kosov was also drafted by Metallurg Magnitogorsk who selected him in the 3rd round (70th overall) of the 2010 KHL Junior Draft.

At the beginning of the 2018–19 season, before making his season debut, Kosov was traded by reigning champions Ak Bars, to HC Spartak Moscow in exchange for Dmitry Yudin on September 3, 2018. Kosov made 24 appearances with Spartak, registering 3 goals and 5 points before he was traded to his fourth KHL club, HC Neftekhimik Nizhnekamsk.

As a free agent leading into the 2021–22 season, Kosov left Traktor Chelyabinsk after two seasons and signed a one-year deal with reigning champions, Avangard Omsk, on 21 May 2021.

Career statistics

Regular season and playoffs

International

Awards and honors

References

External links

1993 births
Living people
Ak Bars Kazan players
Avangard Omsk players
Florida Panthers draft picks
Metallurg Magnitogorsk players
HC Neftekhimik Nizhnekamsk players
People from Magnitogorsk
Russian ice hockey right wingers
HC Spartak Moscow players
Stalnye Lisy players
Traktor Chelyabinsk players
Sportspeople from Chelyabinsk Oblast